Ancient or ancients may refer to:

People or things from antiquity:
Ancient history, from the beginning of writing to the Middle Ages
Prehistory, from the use of the first stone tools until the beginning of writing

It may also refer to:

As a proper name
Ancient (band), a melodic black metal musical group
Ancient (company), a Japanese software developer
Ancients (art group), a group of English artists in the 1820s and 1830s
Ancient (album), a 2001 album by Kitarō

In fiction
Ancient (Stargate), a race who built the Stargates in the Stargate universe
Ancient (Traveller), a mysterious race that once dominated the galaxy in the Traveller role-playing game
Ancients (Eternal Darkness), a god-like race in Eternal Darkness: Sanity's Requiem
Ancients (Legacy of Kain), a race in the Legacy of Kain games
Ancients, an advanced species in the FreeSpace space simulation computer game series
Ancients, a race in the Farscape TV series
Ancients, a variety of creatures and structures in Defense of the Ancients and Dota 2
Ancients or Cetra in Final Fantasy VII
The Ancients, a race of highly advanced worldcrafters in the Might and Magic universe

Other
 A corrupt form of the military rank of ensign used during the 16th century in Britain

See also
Antiquity (disambiguation)
Ancien (disambiguation)
List of time periods
Timeline of ancient history